The Olde Bell  inn, also known as Ye Olde Bell, is a Grade II listed  historical inn in Rye, East Sussex. It was built in 1390. It has a turbulent history and was once used for smuggling, connected by a secret tunnel with the nearby Mermaid Inn to the south. It was used by the infamous Hawkhurst Gang in the 1730s and 1740s who moved goods along the tunnel from the Mermaid to a revolving cupboard in the Old Bell for a quick getaway. The inn has two separate bar areas with original oak beams and a terrace with an 80-year-old Wysteria tree.

References

Buildings and structures completed in 1390
Rye, East Sussex
Grade II listed pubs in East Sussex
Pubs in East Sussex